HD 216770 is an 8th-magnitude star located approximately 124 light-years away in the constellation of Piscis Austrinus. It is an orange dwarf (spectral type K0 V), and is somewhat dimmer and cooler than the Sun.

In 2003 a planet was announced orbiting it by the Geneva Extrasolar Planet Search team.

See also 
 HD 10647
 HD 108874
 HD 111232
 HD 142415
 HD 169830
 HD 41004
 HD 65216
 Lists of exoplanets

References

External links 
 

K-type main-sequence stars
216770
113238
Piscis Austrinus
Planetary systems with one confirmed planet
Durchmusterung objects